The  is a technical university in Chitose, Hokkaido, Japan. It was established in 1998.

References

External links
 

Public universities in Japan
Universities and colleges in Hokkaido
Engineering universities and colleges in Japan